The 43 class were a class of Australian diesel locomotives built by A Goninan & Co, Broadmeadow for the New South Wales Department of Railways in 1956–1957.

Construction
The class of six locomotives was built by A Goninan & Co, Broadmeadow, as sub-contractor to Australian Electrical Industries.

These locomotives were unique in Australia in having Alco power units in GE Transportation Systems designed bodies, a legacy of the former Alco-GE partnership which was dissolved in 1953. Although their design originated in the United States, only two similar UM20 cab and two booster units were ever built in that country, for the Union Pacific and Erie Railroads.

Operation

The 43 class were initially used on the Main Western line from Sydney to Orange, prior to electrification of the line to Lithgow in June 1957, appearing regularly on the Central West Express. Subsequently, they were transferred to Broadmeadow Locomotive Depot operating from Gosford to the Queensland border via both the North Coast and Main North lines. They also saw service on the Main South line.

The 43 class were not popular with the train crews, but they did pave the way for a long line of Alco powered locomotives. They did receive some improvements in the late 1950s with water cooling of the turbo-superchargers replacing the air-cooled units.

Demise
In August 1974, 4301 was taken into Chullora Workshops for a regular overhaul, however a decision was made to use it as spares for the remaining units.

The last was withdrawn in October 1979 with 4306 placed by the Public Transport Commission in the custody of the NSW Rail Museum. It is now a designated NSW heritage item. It was transferred to Thirlmere in March 1980. In 1986, the Illawarra branch of the Rail Transport Museum commenced overhauling 4306 at Yallah. The locomotive returned to traffic in June 1996 and has since been used extensively on charters in New South Wales as well as interstate to Brisbane and Melbourne.

Fleet

4301 – Scrapped

4302 – Scrapped

4303 – Scrapped

4304 – Scrapped

4305 – Scrapped

4306 – Transport Heritage NSW, NSW Rail Museum, Thirlmere, Preserved, Operational

References

Further reading

External links

Co-Co locomotives
Diesel locomotives of New South Wales
Railway locomotives introduced in 1956
Standard gauge locomotives of Australia
Diesel-electric locomotives of Australia
Streamlined diesel locomotives